Simpang Renggam or Sisi Khoo is a town in Kluang District, Johor, Malaysia. Now Simpang Renggam is under the administration of Simpang Renggam District Council. Simpang Renggam District Council was originally Kluang Selatan District Council (Majlis Daerah Kluang Selatan), where the declaration as Simpang Renggam District Council was on 1 January 2001.

Administration
Simpang Renggam District Council, formerly South Kluang District Council is the local authority of Simpang Renggam. This is in line with the restructuring of the State Government with the upgrading of several Local Authorities in the State Johor .

Originally, the Majlis Daerah Simpang Renggam Office is located in Bandar Renggam but the rapid development rate in Pekan Simpang Renggam makes the population focus so fast. So on 1 January 1996, this office was officially moved to Simpang Renggam as the main administrative center.

Majlis Daerah Simpang Renggam consists of five local councils, namely Renggam, Simpang Renggam, Machap, Layang-Layang and Sungai Sayong. Restructuring by the Federal Government in 1979 with legislative powers under the Local Government Act 1976 as the core to the existence of a Local Government that serves as a catalyst for infrastructure to the communities in this region whose area is gazetted under the PW1287 Gazette Plan (JPU.17. 1979) with an estimated population of 49,780 people of various races.

Council Placement 
Consists of 5 settlements namely Renggam, Simpang Renggam, Machap, Sungai Sayong and Layang-Layang with its unique characteristics and history of settlement. The main occupations are as farmers, traders and government and private employees.

The history of the City of Renggam is recorded in the British Museum in United Kingdom i.e. it has received visits Queen Elizabeth II and Queen Victoria in the 1950s. As the main settlement at that time, it has been the focus of the British Colonial who owned large farms such as Guthrie Farm, Ulu Remis Farm and so on that still remain to this day.

Golf courses, airports and old buildings are historical relics that remain to this day.

School 

The following is a list of school names located in the Simpang Renggam area

 Sekolah Menengah Kebangsaan Dato Abdul Rahman Andak
 Sekolah Menengah Kebangsaan Simpang Renggam
 Sekolah Kebangsaan Simpang Rengam
 Sekolah Menengah kebangsaan Dato' Haji Hassan Yunos
 Sekolah Kebangsaan Seri Kampong Renggam
 Sekolah Kebangsaan Dato' Onn Jaafar
 Sekolah Kebangsaan Seri Macap
 Sekolah Jenis Kebangsaan (C) Tuan Poon
 Sekolah Kebangsaan Kampong Dato Ibrahim Majid
 Sekolah Kebangsaan Sungai Linau
 Sekolah Menengah Kebangsaan Dato Ibrahim Majid
 Sekolah Kebangsaan Seri Kencana
 Sekolah Menengah Islam As Syddiq (Private)
 Sekolah Menengah Kebangsaan Seri Machap

Transportation

Train

 Layang-Layang Train Station
 Renggam Train Station  

Bus

 Simpang Renggam Bus Station
 Renggam Bus Station
 Layang-Layang Bus Station  

Taxi

 Taxi Stand Renggam
 Taxi Stand Simpang Rengam
 Taxi Stand Layang-Layang

See also
Renggam, approximately 12 km northeast

Kluang District
Towns in Johor